The Presbyterian Blue Hose women's soccer team represents Presbyterian College in the Big South Conference of NCAA Division I soccer. The program was founded in 1989, and is currently led by Brian Purcell, in his thirtieth season.

Seasons

References

External links
 Official website

 
Soccer clubs in South Carolina
NCAA Division I women's soccer teams